The 2020–21 UMass Lowell River Hawks men's basketball team represented the University of Massachusetts Lowell in the 2020–21 NCAA Division I men's basketball season. They played their home games at the Costello Athletic Center and were led by eighth-year head coach Pat Duquette. In a season limited due to the ongoing COVID-19 pandemic, the River Hawks finished the season 11–12, 7–9 in America East play to finish in sixth place. They defeated Stony Brook, New Hampshire, and UMBC to advance to the championship of the America East tournament. In the championship game, they lost to Hartford.

Previous season
The River Hawks finished the 2019–20 season 13–19, 7–9 in America East play to finish in a tie for sixth place. They lost in the quarterfinals of the America East tournament to Hartford.

Roster

Schedule and results

|-
!colspan=12 style=| Regular season

|-
!colspan=12 style=| America East tournament
|-

Source

References

UMass Lowell River Hawks men's basketball seasons
UMass Lowell River Hawks
UMass Lowell River Hawks men's basketball
UMass Lowell River Hawks men's basketball